MV Hebridean Isles is a ro-ro vehicle ferry owned by Caledonian Maritime Assets and operated by Caledonian MacBrayne on the west coast of Scotland. She was the first MacBrayne vessel to be built outside Scotland and the first to be launched sideways. With bow, stern and side ramps, Hebridean Isles is suitable for all the routes served by the large fleet units. After 15 years crossing the Little Minch on the Uig triangle, she now serves Islay.

History
MV Hebridean Isles (nicknamed "Heb Isles" amongst crew and passengers alike) was constructed at Cochrane Shipbuilders's yard in Selby and launched sideways into the Ouse in 1985. She was the first MacBrayne vessel to be built outside Scotland, the first to be launched sideways and the first to be launched by royalty – the Duchess of Kent.

Following her delivery voyage, she conducted trials at various ports around the network, but did not take up duties at Uig, Skye until spring 1986. MV Columba, the winter relief ship continued there while construction works were carried out at the various piers. Even when she took over at Uig, she still had to use her hoist at the Skye terminal for eight months while the new berth at the end of the pier was finished.

She brought vastly improved standards of passenger comfort and became popular, with slightly reduced sailing times and, once she was able to use her bow and stern ramps, greatly reduced turn-round times.

Layout
MV Hebridean Isles''' design incorporates a bow visor, bow and stern ramps, and a vehicle hoist with side ramps. This made her suitable for all the routes served by the large fleet units. Her spacious car deck can accommodate almost 70 cars, with passenger accommodation on two decks forward of the hoist. One deck comprises the cafeteria furthest aft, then the entrance concourse, shop and information point, with the reclining lounge and bar towards the bow. The bar was converted to a Coffee Cabin in December 2008. Above the cafeteria is the observation lounge with crew accommodation forward of this. The bridge is on the next level at the bow. Externally there is ample deck space including, like the Isle of Arran, a deck area forward of the bridge, giving passengers a view ahead.

Service
MV Hebridean Isles spent her first 15 years crossing the Little Minch from Uig to Tarbert and Lochmaddy (Lochmaddy only on Sundays), using her stern ramp at Uig and her bow visor and ramp at both Tarbert and Lochmaddy. Demand eventually became too much and she was replaced by the larger  in 2001. Operating out of Kennacraig on the Kintyre peninsula, she sailed to Port Ellen and Port Askaig. During the summer season, she continued to Colonsay and Oban on Wednesdays, returning to Kennacraig in the evening. Between 2003 and 2011, she was joined by Isle of Arran in the summer, providing a series of additional sailings throughout the week and maintaining the service on Wednesdays during the Oban extension.

For six months from October 2002, she was chartered to NorthLink Ferries and inaugurated their Stromness to Scrabster service. She continues to relieve there each winter.

During June and July 2010, Hebridean Isles was redeployed on the Oban to Coll and Tiree run, replacing , which had suffered major engine problems. She hit the pier at Scarinish, Tiree, on the late afternoon of 29 June 2010, sustaining a hole above the waterline. Reverse pitch was selected prior to the collision but an unspecified problem prevented reverse engaging. The vessel returned to Oban for repair and resumed the Coll and Tiree run two days after the incident.

In summer 2011,  joined Hebridean Isles as the main Islay vessel, freeing up Isle of Arran as a spare vessel.

On 28 January 2014, it was announced that Hebridean Isles would temporarily take over freight services between Ullapool and Stornoway in the Western Isles, due to the freight ferry  colliding with the pier at Stornoway.Hebridean Isles relieved on the Uig Triangle, alongside , in January and February 2016 whilst  was away covering for other vessels.

In October 2016, Hebridean Isles provided a twice-nightly freight service on the Ullapool - Stornoway route whilst  was in dry-dock.

From 3 January to 21 January 2017, Hebridean Isles relieved on the Ardrossan-Brodick crossing alongside  whilst  was away for her annual overhaul. She repeated this relief service in January 2018, 2019 and 2020.

During April and May 2018, Hebridean Isles operated an Oban-Lochboisdale service whilst  covered for s repair at James Watt Dock in Greenock.

Hebridean Isles provided additional capacity on the Ardrossan-Brodick crossing, in addition to her first ever sailing to Campbeltown  due to Caledonian Isles operating with a reduced capacity. Additionally,  provided additional sailings on the Claonaig to Lochranza crossing to help ease congestion.

From January - February 2022 Hebridean Isles relieved on the Ardrossan - Brodick route. She operated the route alone (rather than alongside Isle of Arran) due to a temporary timetable caused by Covid-19-related staff absences. She remained on the route for over a month, as a result of delays to Caledonian Isles' return to service.

In January 2023, Hebridean Isles was scheduled to relieve Caledonian Isles on the Ardrossan - Brodick route, alongside Isle of Arran. The service saw heavy disruption, as Hebridean Isles was affected by a number of technical faults, resulting in Isle of Arran operating the service alone. Hebridean Isles provided some freight services between Brodick and Troon, before experiencing another fault in late February resulting again in her removal from service. The situation was compounded by the delayed return of Caledonian Isles'' from annual overhaul.

See also
 Caledonian MacBrayne fleet

References

External links

 MV Hebridean Isles on www.calmac.co.uk

Caledonian MacBrayne
Ships built in Selby
1985 ships